Events in the year 1965 in Sweden.

Incumbents
 Monarch – Gustaf VI Adolf
 Prime Minister – Tage Erlander

Births
Hans Wallmark.
5 January - Patrik Sjöberg, high jumper 
29 January - Peter Lundgren, tennis player and coach
27 February - Joakim Sundström, sound editor, sound designer and musician
7 March - Jesper Parnevik, golfer
4 August - Fredrik Reinfeldt, Swedish Prime Minister
3 October - Jan-Ove Waldner, table tennis player
9 December - Martin Ingvarsson.

Deaths
7 March - Louise, Queen-consort of Sweden (born 1889). 
26 July - Edvin Fältström (born 1890).
17 October - Anders Henrikson (born 1896).

References

 
Years of the 20th century in Sweden
1960s in Sweden
Sweden
Sweden